Sarah Lacina (born July 9, 1984) is an American police officer best known for competing on the American reality show Survivor. She came in 11th place and was the first jury member in the show's 28th season, Survivor: Cagayan, in 2014. Lacina was voted the winner of the show's 34th season, Survivor: Game Changers in 2017. She competed for a third time in Survivor: Winners at War, the show's 40th season, in 2020 where she finished in 4th place and was the final jury member.

Although she has been largely praised for her individual game in Game Changers, she is also known for her long-lasting partnership with fellow contestant Tony Vlachos, who also took part in all three of her seasons, as the “Cops R’ Us” duo (in reference to both of them being police officers). The duo is "undefeated", as each of their seasons was won by one of the two, and they are largely recognized as one of the best duos in Survivor history, especially for Winners at War.

Early life
Lacina was born in Muscatine, Iowa, where she grew up with her parents Lorrie and Ronald. She attended Muscatine High School where she was a four-sport athlete. She then attended Wartburg College in Waverly, where she competed on the track and cross country teams and earned a Bachelor's degree in Social Work.

After college, Lacina moved to Cedar Rapids and became a police officer. Her mother, who has worked in law enforcement and has managed the Muscatine County Joint Communications Center, served as her inspiration to become a cop. Lacina once worked as a resource officer at Kennedy High School in Cedar Rapids. Afterwards, she joined the Cedar Rapids Police Department as a police investigator. There, she met an officer who inspired her to take up mixed martial arts. In 2010, she competed in her first professional MMA fight, a first-round victory by submission.

Survivor

Cagayan

Lacina was one of 18 castaways to compete on Survivor: Cagayan, the 28th season of Survivor. The theme of the season was "Brawn vs. Brains vs. Beauty." As a police officer, she started on the "Brawn" tribe (Aparri). She immediately recognized that her tribe mate Tony Vlachos was also a cop, and though she tried to confront him about it, Vlachos denied it. However, he later told her he was a cop, and the two  formed an alliance called Cops-R-Us. Aparri won the first four immunity challenges, but after the tribe swap, she was the only original Aparri member to remain on that tribe. She managed to reach the merge; however, after Solana, the other tribe left in the game, won the final pre-merge immunity challenge, Vlachos hugged the other four members of Solana while screaming "Top five!", which made her question Vlachos's loyalty.

Following the merge, Lacina was the swing vote between the old Aparri alliance and old Solana alliance, and she became indecisive about her position. Vlachos tried to sway her back to his side, but she chose not to go back because she did not trust him. She wanted to vote him out at the first post-merge Tribal Council, but she ultimately agreed with the other members of the Aparri alliance to target Jefra Bland. However, Trish Hegarty of the Solana alliance wanted to target Lacina, and she pleaded with Kass McQuillen of the Aparri alliance to flip. At Tribal Council, McQuillen flipped and joined the Solana alliance in blindsiding Lacina. She finished in 11th place and was the first member of the jury.

At the Final Tribal Council, Lacina voiced her frustration to Vlachos for swearing on his badge and going back on his word, and said she would have never done that. However, she ultimately cast her vote for Vlachos to win, which he did in an 8–1 vote.

Game Changers

Lacina returned for the 34th season, Survivor: Game Changers. She only went to Tribal Council twice before the merge due to being part of very strong tribes that did well in immunity challenges. After reaching the merge, she stayed in the middle, navigating between alliances, in order to have more options. For most of the post-merge phase, she positioned herself as the swing vote many times, turned on several of her allies (including Debbie Wanner), had a hand in several blindsides, managed to find the vote-stealer advantage and successfully play it, and inherited the Legacy Advantage upon Sierra Dawn Thomas's elimination. At the Final Six, Lacina successfully saved herself by claiming the immunity offered by the Legacy Advantage. She, Brad Culpepper, and "Troyzan" Robertson also formed an alliance, and all three of them managed to make it to the Final Tribal Council.

Despite being accused, specifically by Ozzy Lusth, of backstabbing most of the jurors and using her social connections for strategic gain, the ways that she managed to have strategic control, be the driving force, and still maintain social connections were praised by certain jurors, particularly Zeke Smith and Michaela Bradshaw. She ended up becoming the Sole Survivor, and winner of the season, over Culpepper and Robertson in a 7–3–0 vote. She received votes from Smith, Bradshaw, Hali Ford, Andrea Boehlke, Cirie Fields, Aubry Bracco, and Tai Trang. Only Lusth, Thomas, and Wanner did not vote for Lacina; they voted instead for Culpepper, while Robertson received no votes from the jury.

Winners at War

Lacina came back as a contestant on the show's 40th season, Survivor: Winners at War. She was originally a member of the Dakal tribe, where she realigned with Vlachos and found the Vote Steal Advantage when she had to go to the other tribe to receive it, as per the note she received from Natalie Anderson, who was on Edge of Extinction. She was moved to the Yara tribe alongside Sophie Clarke when the tribe switch occurred. While they were outnumbered 3-2 and Lacina was a target on Day 14, she was spared when original Sele's Ben Driebergen and Adam Klein joined herself and Clarke in voting out Rob Mariano.

Lacina reached the merge, where she reconnected with Vlachos and became a part of his majority alliance. Lacina became a target once again after she gave her reward to Nick Wilson on his birthday, which players like Klein felt was calculated. Later on, Lacina used her Vote Steal advantage to steal Denise Stapley's vote on Day 25, resulting in Tyson Apostol's elimination. While Vlachos later blindsided Clarke, Lacina still continued to trust and work with him. The two worked together to vote Spradlin-Wolfe, subsequently turning on and voting out allies Wilson and Stapley. On Day 37, she organized Driebergen's elimination but left Vlachos out in order to make a move against him and increase her chances of winning. On Day 38 she was pitted against Vlachos in the fire-making challenge. While her fire reached the rope first, Vlachos would go on to win, making Lacina the nineteenth person eliminated from Survivor: Winners at War and the 16th and final member of the largest jury ever.

At the Final Tribal Council, she remained loyal to Vlachos by voting for him to win. She was one of the twelve jurors that voted for Vlachos, making him the sole Survivor and second two-time winner in Survivor history.

The Challenge
In 2022, Lacina competed on the CBS series The Challenge: USA where she finished as the female winner of the season, taking home $254,500. As a result of winning, she also qualified for the upcoming series The Challenge: Global Championship on Paramount+.

Personal life
Lacina lives in Marion, Iowa, with her husband and fellow police officer, Wyatt Wardenburg, and their son Knox.

Filmography

Television

References

External links
Official CBS biography page

1984 births
American people of Italian descent
American police officers
Living people
People from Cedar Rapids, Iowa
People from Muscatine, Iowa
Survivor (American TV series) winners
Winners in the Survivor franchise
Wartburg College alumni
Muscatine High School alumni
The Challenge (TV series) contestants